Robat-e Abu ol Qasem (also Romanized as Robāţ-e Abū ol Qāsem) is a village in Kenarrudkhaneh Rural District, in the Central District of Golpayegan County, Isfahan Province, Iran. At the 2006 census, its population was 144, in 44 families.

See also
Robat (disambiguation)

References

Populated places in Golpayegan County